Johan Donar (born 24 March 1966) is a former professional tennis player from Sweden.

Career
Donar was a doubles specialist and appeared in only one singles event during his career on the ATP Tour, at Mexico City in 1993, where he was defeated in the opening round by Thomas Muster. His best ever singles ranking was 371 in the world.

He broke into the top 100 of the doubles rankings in 1992, after winning the tournament in Palermo, with countryman Ola Jonsson. Earlier that year he was a semi-finalist twice, both times with Jan Apell, at Kitzbuhel and then Prague.

In 1993 he took part in all four Grand Slam events, but wasn't able to register a win in any of his matches. He partnered Peter Nyborg at Wimbledon, but played beside Jonsson in the other three tournaments.

ATP career finals

Doubles: 1 (1–0)

Challenger titles

Doubles: (2)

References

1966 births
Living people
Swedish male tennis players
Tennis players from Stockholm
20th-century Swedish people